Patrick H. Pentzer (1839 – October 16, 1901) was an American soldier who fought with the Union Army in the American Civil War. Pentzer received his country's highest award for bravery during combat, the Medal of Honor, for actions taken on April 9, 1865, during the Battle of Fort Blakely.

Biography
Pentzer was born in 1839 in Marion County, Missouri, but lived most of his life in Illinois. During the Civil War, Pentzel enlisted at Gillespie, Macoupin County, Illinois. He initially served as a private in Company H of the 9th Illinois Infantry, then re-enlisted as sergeant-major of the 97th Illinois Infantry Regiment where he served three years.

On February 14, 1863, he was promoted to a Captain the 97th regiment. During the Battle of Fort Blakely, Pentzel captured the enemy colors and surrender of Confederate General Francis Cockrell which earned him the Medal of Honor.

Medal of Honor citation

Personal life
Pentzer married his wife, Mary, on June 19, 1870. He died on October 16, 1901, and was interred in Springfield National Cemetery.

References

1839 births
1901 deaths
American Civil War recipients of the Medal of Honor
People from Marion County, Missouri
People of Illinois in the American Civil War
Burials at Springfield National Cemetery
United States Army Medal of Honor recipients